Pat Hurst (born May 23, 1969) is an American professional golfer who plays on the LPGA Tour.

Hurst's mother is originally from Japan and her father is an American of German heritage. She was born in San Leandro, California, and raised in the Bay Area.

Amateur career
As an amateur, Hurst won the 1986 U.S. Girls' Junior and the 1990 U.S. Women's Amateur. In 1989 Hurst was also a U.S. Women's Amateur medalist and was a member of the 1990 U.S. Espirito Santo Trophy team.

Hurst played college golf at San José State University and won team and individual NCAA titles in 1989. In 1989, she won the Honda Award (now the Honda Sports Award) as the best female collegiate golfer in the nation. She was All-American First team in 1989 and 1990, Big West Champion in 1988 and Big West Champion and Athlete of the Year in 1990. She is a member of the San Jose State Sports Hall of Fame.

Professional career
Hurst left San Jose State in 1991 and turned professional. She entered LPGA Tour Qualifying School in 1991 and in 1992, missing both times, the second time by one stroke. Hurst spent the next few years working as a teaching pro at La Quinta Country Club and playing on the Players West Tour, where she won five times. She eventually quit playing golf at one point, taking a job at a Nevada Bob's store in her hometown of San Leandro.

She entered the LPGA Qualifying Tournament again in 1994 and tied for 20th to earn exempt status for the 1995 season.

Hurst won Rookie of the Year honors in her debut season on the LPGA Tour in 1995. She has six career LPGA titles, including one major, the Nabisco Dinah Shore in 1998. Hurst lost a playoff to Annika Sörenstam at the U.S. Women's Open in 2006, the last conducted over a full 18 holes. Hurst's win at the Nabisco Dinah Shore in 1998 makes her exempt for the U.S. Senior Women's Open for ten years (2020–2029).

Hurst's best money list finish was sixth in 2000, and she represented the U.S. in five Solheim Cups (1998, 2000, 2002, 2005, and 2007). She was named the captain of the 2021 Solheim Cup team.

Professional wins (11)

LPGA Tour wins (6)

LPGA Tour playoff record (0–4)

Players West Tour (5)
1991–94 Five wins

Major championships

Wins (1)

Results timeline
Results not in chronological order before 2015.

^ The Women's British Open replaced the du Maurier Classic as an LPGA major in 2001
^^ The Evian Championship was added as a major in 2013

WD = withdrew
CUT = missed the half-way cut
T = tied

Summary

Most consecutive cuts made – 12 (1998 Kraft Nabisco – 2001 U.S. Open)
Longest streak of top-10s – 2 (2006 LPGA – 2006 U.S. Open)

U.S. national team appearances
Amateur
Espirito Santo Trophy: 1990 (winners)

Professional
Solheim Cup: 1998 (winners), 2000, 2002 (winners), 2005 (winners), 2007 (winners)
World Cup: 2007, 2008
Handa Cup: 2015 (winners)

Solheim Cup record

References

External links

American female golfers
San Jose State Spartans women's golfers
LPGA Tour golfers
Winners of ladies' major amateur golf championships
Winners of LPGA major golf championships
Solheim Cup competitors for the United States
Golfers from California
American sportspeople of Japanese descent
American people of German descent
People from San Leandro, California
People from Danville, California
1969 births
Living people